The hooded spider monkey (Ateles geoffroyi grisescens) is a subspecies of Geoffroy's spider monkey, a type of New World monkey, from Central America, native to Panama.  It also might be found in a small portion of Colombia adjacent to Panama.  In western Colombia and northeast Panama it is replaced by the Black-headed spider monkey, A. fusciceps.  In western Panama, it is replaced by another subspecies of Geoffroy's Spider Monkey, the Ornate spider monkey, A. g. ornatus.  The Hooded spider monkey has long, tawny fur.

References

Primates of Central America
Mammals of Colombia
Spider monkeys
Mammals described in 1866
Taxa named by John Edward Gray